The Grand Hotel Saltsjöbaden is a hotel in Saltsjöbaden, Sweden. Built on the initiative of Knut Agathon Wallenberg, it was opened in 1893 by King Oscar II of Sweden. The hotel was owned by the Wallenberg family until 1999, when it was purchased by Nordisk Renting who sold it in 2002 to Danish-Egyptian hotel owner Enan Galaly's chain Helnan Hotels. On 20 December 1938, the Saltsjöbaden Agreement was signed at the hotel. It hosted three Bilderberg meetings, in 1962, 1973, and 1984.

References

External links
 Official website

1893 establishments in Sweden
Hotel buildings completed in 1893
Hotels established in 1893
Hotels in Sweden